José Ramón de la Fuente (a native of Santa Cristina d’Aro) is a Spanish goalkeeper and goalkeeping coach. Mostly known for his coaching, he is the goalkeeper coach of FC Barcelona. He was appointed under manager Tito Vilanova, and has remained in his role through all managements since then.

Playing career
Fuente played for FC Barcelona B in the 1994-95 season.

Coaching career
Fuente retired while playing at Écija FC started his coaching career with Écija FC in 2006. He has coached sides like Hércules CF (2008–09), Racing FC Union Luxembourg as assistant coach (2009–10), Gimnàstic de Tarragona (2010–11) and back to Hércules (2011–12).

References

External links
 

Living people
Spanish footballers
Association football goalkeepers
La Liga players
FC Barcelona Atlètic players
1970 births